is a passenger railway station located in  Naka-ku, Yokohama, Kanagawa Prefecture, Japan, operated by the private railway company Keikyū.

Lines
Hinodechō Station is served by the Keikyū Main Line and is located 24.8 kilometers from the terminus of the line at Shinagawa  Station in Tokyo.

Station layout
The station consists of two elevated opposed side platforms with the station building underneath.

Platform screen doors will be installed on both platforms over a one-week period from 26 March to 2 April 2022.

Platforms

History
Hinodechō Station was opened on 26 December 1931.

Keikyū introduced station numbering to its stations on 21 October 2010; Hinodechō Station was assigned station number KK39.

Passenger statistics
In fiscal 2019, the station was used by an average of 28,487 passengers daily. 

The passenger figures for previous years are as shown below.

Surrounding area
Honcho Elementary School
Azuma Elementary School
Oimatsu Junior High School
Ooka River

See also
 List of railway stations in Japan

References

External links

 

Naka-ku, Yokohama
Railway stations in Kanagawa Prefecture
Railway stations in Japan opened in 1931
Keikyū Main Line
Railway stations in Yokohama